Kingsgate Bridge is a striking, modern reinforced concrete construction footbridge across the River Wear, in Durham, England. It is a Grade I listed building. It was personally designed in 1963 by Ove Arup, the last structure he ever designed. Kingsgate Bridge connects Bow Lane on the historic peninsula in the centre of Durham to Dunelm House on New Elvet (to which building Arup's studio also contributed), and opened in 1966. Kingsgate Bridge is thought to have been one of Arup's favourite designs of all, he having spent many hours working on every detail of the plans.

Its construction was unusual. The two halves were each built parallel to the river, then rotated through 90° to make the crossing. The meeting point of the two halves is marked by a simple bronze expansion joint using a linear gear bearing.

In 1965, the bridge was the winner of the Civic Trust Award.

In 1993, it won Certificate of Outstanding Performance (Mature Structures Category) of the Concrete Society.

A bust of Arup, cast in resin, was installed on the side of Dunelm House, the students' union building adjacent to the bridge, in September 2011.  The sculpture is a copy of a 1987 bust by Diana Brandenburger, held by the National Portrait Gallery. It is a replacement for a previous copy of the same bust, in bronze, which was unveiled by Karin Perry, Arup's daughter, on 16 April 2003, the 108th anniversary of Arup's birth, but which was stolen from its plinth during the summer of 2006.

In February 1998, the Durham Union Society president, Tom Joyce, fell through the bridge, but caught himself and was uninjured. This event was described in the Palatinate as ‘an Indiana Jones style adventure’ with Mr Joyce himself being quoted with the immortal words  ‘there was no time to fear’. 

During a university RAG Week in the late 1960s students suspended a car beneath the bridge.

Gallery

References

Bridges across the River Wear
Bridges in County Durham
Bridges completed in 1966
Ove Arup buildings and structures
Grade I listed bridges
Durham, Kingsgate
Buildings and structures in Durham, England
Pedestrian bridges in England
Recipients of Civic Trust Awards
1966 establishments in England
Buildings and structures of Durham University
Brutalist architecture in England